Todd D. Novak (born April 23, 1965) is an American newspaper editor and politician.

Born in Cobb, Wisconsin and currently residing in Dodgeville, Wisconsin, Novak was the government and assistant editor of the Dodgeville Chronicle newspaper from 1990 until his retirement in 2014. In 2012, Novak was elected mayor of Dodgeville, Wisconsin.

In November 2014, Novak was elected to the Wisconsin State Assembly as a Republican by a 64-vote margin. The Democratic candidate, Dick Cates, did not seek a recount.

On November 8, 2016, Novak was re-elected to the Wisconsin State Assembly by a margin of 723 votes, defeating Democrat Jeff Wright.

In 2018, Novak defeated Jeff Wright for a second time. Novak was also successful in winning an Assembly District also won by Democratic Governor Tony Evers.

On November 3, 2020, Novak was re-elected to his forth term in the Wisconsin State Assembly. Novak defeated his challenger, Democrat Kriss Marion by a margin of 1,258 votes. His largest margin since first being elected to the Wisconsin State Assembly.

Although a Republican, Novak has positioned himself as an "independent voice" and has touted a bipartisan voting record, which is helpful in his liberal-leaning district.

Wisconsin State Assembly 
For the 2021-2022 Legislative Cycle, Representative Novak serves on the following committees
 Assembly Committee on Local Government (Chair)
 Speakers Task Force on Water Quality (Chair)
 Assembly Committee on Agriculture (Vice Chair)
 Assembly Committee on Criminal Justice & Public Safety
 Assembly Committee on Mental Health
 Assembly Committee on Rural Development
 Assembly Committee on Environment

In his inaugural term in the State Assembly, Novak authored a bill creating the Frank Lloyd Wright Trail which links the architects notable creations using existing roadways.

On February 11, 2019, Speaker Vos appointed Novak chairman of a 16 member bipartisan task force on water quality.  The task force was created to provide recommendations on assessing and improving the quality of surface water and groundwater throughout the state of Wisconsin.  The task force has traveled extensively throughout the state, visiting the cities of Milwaukee, Madison, Green Bay, Janesville, Racine, Lancaster, LaCrosse, Mauston, Stevens Point, Menomonie, Tomahawk, Marinette, and Superior holding public hearings to gather information on specific concerns in the various regions of the state.

Representative Novak authored two bills as a result of the task force findings. The first bill, 2019 Assembly Bill 790 increases funding for Wisconsin Land and Water Conservation staff. The bill also adds new language calling for conservation staff to work to implement the Conservation Reserve Enhancement Program (CREP). The CREP leverages federal and state funding to compensate farmers to voluntarily decommission farm land and implement conservation practices. The second bill, 2019 Assembly Bill 801 provides funding to the University of Wisconsin System to implement the Freshwater Collaborative. The Freshwater Collaborative Program is designed to address two unique challenges relevant in Wisconsin, Agriculture Water Management, and Water Quality Safety and emerging contaminants. As part of the Freshwater Collaborative, the UW System will work to establish and develop a variety of undergraduate programs focused on preparing the Wisconsin Workforce to address Water Management and Water Quality safety issues while expanding opportunities for research and collaboration across campuses.

Electoral history

References 

1965 births
Living people
People from Dodgeville, Wisconsin
Editors of Wisconsin newspapers
Mayors of places in Wisconsin
Wisconsin Independents
Republican Party members of the Wisconsin State Assembly
LGBT mayors of places in the United States
LGBT state legislators in Wisconsin
LGBT people from Wisconsin
Gay politicians
21st-century American politicians
People from Iowa County, Wisconsin